Nestor Raul Renderos López (born September 10, 1988 in San Salvador, El Salvador) is a Salvadoran professional footballer who plays as a midfielder.

Club career

Alianza FC

In 2005, Renderos signed with Alianza F.C.

FAS

In 2010, he signed with C.D. FAS. He has not left C.D. FAS despite receiving offers.

Zakho

In 2016, Renderso was sent on loan to Iraqi club Zakho with an option to buy.

Honours

Player

Club
C.D. FAS
 Primera División
 Runners-up: Clausura 2011, Clausura 2013, Apertura 2013, Apertura 2015

References

External links
 Néstor Renderos at Soccerway 

1988 births
Living people
People from San Salvador
Association football midfielders
Salvadoran footballers
Alianza F.C. footballers
C.D. FAS footballers
El Salvador international footballers
2013 Copa Centroamericana players
2013 CONCACAF Gold Cup players
2014 Copa Centroamericana players
2015 CONCACAF Gold Cup players
2017 Copa Centroamericana players
Expatriate footballers in Iraq
Salvadoran expatriate footballers